Diying Township is a township of Xingtang County in western Hebei province, China, located less than  west of the county seat across G5 Beijing–Kunming Expressway. , it has 29 villages under its administration.

See also
List of township-level divisions of Hebei

References

Township-level divisions of Hebei